Blackwall may refer to:

Places
Blackwall, London, an area of east London, UK
Blackwall Tunnel, the main crossing of the River Thames in east London
Blackwall Yard, a former shipyard 
The former shipyard at Leamouth, London of Thames Ironworks and Shipbuilding Company and others.
London and Blackwall Railway
Blackwall railway station - former eastern terminus of the railway
Blackwall DLR station, a station in East London on the Docklands Light Railway
Blackwall Buildings - philanthropic housing built by the London and Blackwall Railway in Whitechapel
Blackwall, New South Wales - A suburb in New South Wales, Australia
Blackwall, Queensland - A suburb in Queensland, Australia
Blackwall, Tasmania - A suburb in Tasmania, Australia
Blackwall Reach (disambiguation), any of several points with that name

People
Blackwall (surname)

Other
Blackwall Frigate - A class of merchant sailing ship built at Blackwall Yard
Blackwall hitch, a method of temporarily attaching a rope to a hook
HMS Blackwall (1696), a 50-gun ship of the English Royal Navy
Blackwall, a character in the 2014 video game Dragon Age: Inquisition

See also
Blackwell (disambiguation)